Valerii Macrițchii (born 13 February 1996) is a Moldovan professional footballer who plays as a midfielder.

International
He made his debut for senior Moldova national football team on 26 February 2018 in a friendly against Saudi Arabia.

Honours 
FC Sheriff Tiraspol

 Divizia Națională: 2012–13, 2013–14
 Moldovan Cup: 2014–15
 Divizia "A": 2011–12
 Moldovan Super Cup: 2013, 2015

Personal
He is a twin brother of Andrei Macrițchii.

References

External links 
 

1996 births
Living people
Moldovan footballers
Association football midfielders
Moldova youth international footballers
Moldova under-21 international footballers
Moldova international footballers
FC Sheriff Tiraspol players
Speranța Nisporeni players
CS Petrocub Hîncești players
FC Sfîntul Gheorghe players
FC Dinamo-Auto Tiraspol players
Moldovan Super Liga players
Liga II players
FC Ripensia Timișoara players
Twin sportspeople
Moldovan twins
Moldovan expatriate footballers
Moldovan expatriate sportspeople in Romania
Expatriate footballers in Romania